Sheykh Mahalleh (also Romanized as Sheykh Maḩalleh) is a village in Virmuni Rural District, in the Central District of Astara County, Gilan Province, Iran. At the 2006 census, its population was 873, in 202 families.

Language 
Linguistic composition of the village.

References 

Populated places in Astara County

Talysh settlements in Gilan Province